The Phallales are an order of fungi in the subclass Phallomycetidae. The order contains two families: the Claustulaceae, and the Phallaceae, which, according to a 2008 estimate, collectively contain 26 genera and 88 species.

See also 

 List of taxa named after human genitals

References

External links

  MushroomExpert.com: the Order Phallales

 
Basidiomycota orders